Otar Leontyevich Koberidze (17 December 1924 – 9 March 2015) was a Georgian actor, film director and screenwriter.

Biography
Koberidze was born in Tiflis, Georgian SSR (now Tbilisi, Georgia), where he graduated from the Rustaveli State Theatre Institute in 1948. He then worked at the Drama Theater in Sukhumi and Marjanishvili Theater in Tbilisi. He played more than 50 roles during his career at the film studio Kartuli Pilmi, including a memorable role of a 17th-century Georgian hero in the 1956 historical action film Bashi-Achuki. He directed ten films and wrote scripts for three films. 

Koberidze was awarded the title of People's Artist of Georgia in 1967. He died at the age of 90 in Tbilisi in 2015. Koberidze was married to the Georgian actress Lia Eliava (1934–1998).

Selected filmography

1948: Keto da Kote as episode
1956: Bashi-Achuki as Bashi-Achuki
1957: Qalis tvirti as Akaki
1958: Other People's Children as Dato
1958: Mamluqi as Mahmudi
1960: Dge ukanaskneli, dge pirveli as Levani
1960: Shetskvetili simgera as Gurami
1961: Lyubushka as Grechukha
1962: 713 Requests Permission to Land as Henry
1963: A Dream Come True as Cosmonaut Ivan Batalov
1963: Generali da zizilebi as Navigating Officer Raner Peter
1964: Attack and Retreat as Wounded Italian
1964: Zgvis shvilebi as Gurami
1965: The Tsar's Bride as Grigori Gryaznoy
1966: The Little Prince as pilot
1967: Qalaqi adre igvidzebs as Tengizi
1967: Aladdin's Magic Lamp as The Sultan
1967: Commissar as Kirill
1968: Spur des Falken as Tasunka-witko
1969: The Red Tent as Natale Cecioni
1971: Mission in Kabul as Nadir-Khan
1971: Daisi as Kiazo
1972: Chadziruli qalaqis madziebelni as Edisheri
1973: Rustam i Sukhrab as Kavoos
1973: Mze shemodgomisa as  himself
1975: Gaqtseva gatenebisas as Kotsia Eristavi
1979: Life Is Beautiful as Alvarado
1983: Blue Mountains as movie star (himself)
2001: Antimoz iverieli   (final film role)

See also
 Queen of Blood
 Mikhail Karyukov
 Battle Beyond the Sun

References

External links

Otar Koberidze at the Georgian Cinema Database 

1924 births
2015 deaths
Male film actors from Georgia (country)
Film directors from Georgia (country)
Actors from Tbilisi
People's Artists of Georgia
Soviet male film actors
Soviet  film directors
Burials at Didube Pantheon
20th-century male actors from Georgia (country)
Film people from Tbilisi
Soviet male actors